Veeram Velanja Mannu is a 1998 Indian Tamil-language action drama film  directed by Kasthuri Raja starring Vijayakanth, Roja and Khushbu. Manorama, Manivannan and Radharavi,  play other supporting roles, while Deva composed the score and soundtrack for the film. The film released in October 1998 to average reviews.

Cast

Vijayakanth as Duraipandi/DSP Vijay
Khushbu as Sevanamma
Roja as Village Girl
Manorama as Virumayi
Manivannan as Manikandan
Radharavi as M.L.A Sundarapandi
Senthil as Andiappan
Vinu Chakravarthy as Muthu Karuppan
Ponnambalam as Police inspector
Major Sundarrajan as Commissioner of Police
Chandini as Meenamma
Mahanadi Shankar as a Police inspector

Soundtrack
The music composed by Deva.

Release
A critic from Dinakaran noted "Kasturi Raja, though he has designed his song scenes in the usual folk culture style, has picturised the other scenes and human passions and sentiments in a remarkably, brilliant way".

References

External links

1998 films
1990s Tamil-language films
Indian action films
Films scored by Deva (composer)
Films directed by Kasthuri Raja
1998 action films